Blennidus filicornis is a species of ground beetle in the subfamily Pterostichinae. It was described by Straneo in 1993.

References

Blennidus
Beetles described in 1993